Jeff York (March 23, 1912 – October 11, 1995) was an American film and television actor who began his career in the late 1930s using his given name, Granville Owen Scofield. He was also sometimes credited as Jeff Yorke.

Career
York served in the United States Army during World War II.  During his early career, the tall, dark-haired actor played characters such as Pat Ryan in the 1940 serial Terry and the Pirates and was given the lead in the 1940 film Li'l Abner. However, he is perhaps most remembered for his role as Bud Searcy in Disney's classic Old Yeller and its 1963 sequel Savage Sam. Beverly Washburn played Lisbeth Searcy, Bud's daughter. York also appeared in The Great Locomotive Chase, Westward Ho, the Wagons!, and Johnny Tremain which were all Walt Disney's productions.

York attracted considerable attention in the mid 1950s with his television portrayal of Mike Fink, the flamboyant keelboat operator in two episodes of Disney's hugely popular Davy Crockett miniseries in the episodes "Davy Crockett's Keelboat Race" and "Davy Crockett and the River Pirates." York was cast opposite Fess Parker in the role. The first episode featured a memorable boasting contest and a keelboat race, with Fink's boat named The Gullywumper; in the second, Crockett and Fink join forces to fight a band of river pirates who blame their depredations on local Indians.

He also starred as mountain man/fur trapper Joe Crane in two different Disney series, The Saga of Andy Burnett, adapted from the Stewart Edward White novel The Long Rifle and Zorro.

 
 
In addition, York was a guest star of The Lone Ranger (2 episodes), Waterfront, Studio 57, Medic, Fireside Theater, You Are There (2 episodes), The Californians, Peter Gunn, Bronco, Lawman (2 episodes), Cheyenne, The Rifleman, Outlaws, Perry Mason (3 episodes), Daniel Boone, Zorro (3 episodes), and The Iron Horse.

He co-starred as "Reno McKee" with Roger Moore, Dorothy Provine, and Ray Danton in the 1959 ABC/Warner Brothers western television series, The Alaskans.

Among his three appearances on Perry Mason, York played roles as the defendant in two 1961 episodes: Pete Mallory in "The Case of the Difficult Detour", and Scott Cahill in "The Case of the Traveling Treasure." In 1964, he played murderer and title character Ross Walker in "The Case of the Arrogant Arsonist."

Filmography

1937: Kid Galahad – Reporter (uncredited)
1937: The Devil's Saddle Legion – Chris Madden
1937: That Certain Woman – Reporter (uncredited)
1937: Alcatraz Island – (uncredited)
1937: The Adventurous Blonde – Dr. Nally
1937: Expensive Husbands – Announcer at Polo Game (uncredited)
1938: Start Cheering – Student (uncredited)
1940: Terry and the Pirates – Pat Ryan
1940: Golden Gloves – George Swift (uncredited)
1940: Li'l Abner – Li'l Abner
1941: Sunny – Jim Day
1942: Nazi Agent – Keeler (uncredited)
1942: Kid Glove Killer – Henchman (uncredited)
1945: They Were Expendable – Ens. Tony Aiken
1946: Up Goes Maisie – Elmer Sauders
1946: The Postman Always Rings Twice – Blair
1946: Little Miss Big – Clancy
1946: The Yearling – Oliver Hutto (uncredited)
1946: Alias Mr. Twilight – Police Lt. Barton
1947: Fear in the Night – Deputy Torrence
1947: Blondie's Anniversary – Paul Madison (Class of '32)
1947: Unconquered – Wide-Shouldered Bond Slave (uncredited)
1948: Panhandle – Jack
1948: Isn't It Romantic? – Elmer – Burly Gent
1948: The Three Musketeers – Officer (uncredited)
1948: The Paleface – Big Joe
1949: Knock on Any Door – Man (uncredited)
1949: Special Agent – Jake Rumpler
1949: Samson and Delilah – Spectator at Temple (uncredited)
1949: The Inspector General – Guard (uncredited)
1950: Kill the Umpire – Panhandle Jones (uncredited)
1950: Father of the Bride – Policeman (uncredited)
1950: The Asphalt Jungle – Policeman (uncredited)
1950: Surrender – Canning
1950: Watch the Birdie – Mr. Tirson (uncredited)
1950: Short Grass – Curley
1951: The Redhead and the Cowboy – Lt. Wylie (uncredited)
1951: The Unknown Man – Jail Guard (uncredited)
1951: The Lady Says No – Goose
1952: The Duel at Silver Creek – Abe Cooney (uncredited)
1952: Kansas City Confidential – Captain McBride (uncredited)
1954: Demetrius and the Gladiators – Albus (uncredited)
1955: It's a Dog's Life – John L. Sullivan (uncredited)
1956: The Great Locomotive Chase – William Campbell 
1956: Westward Ho, the Wagons! – Hank Breckenridge
1956: Davy Crockett and the River Pirates (TV Series) – Mike Fink
1957: Johnny Tremain – James Otis
1957: Old Yeller – Bud Searcy
1963: Savage Sam – Bud Searcy
1967: Tammy and the Millionaire – Grundy Onyx Purewater Tate (final film role)

External links

1912 births
1995 deaths
20th-century American male actors
American male film actors
American male television actors
Male actors from Los Angeles
United States Army personnel of World War II